The Philippines Football League is the top tier league of Philippine football. The following page details the football records and statistics of the PFL.

League records

Titles
Most titles: 3, Ceres–Negros
Most consecutive title wins: 3, Ceres–Negros, (2017, 2018, 2019)
Biggest title-winning margin: 12 points, 2019; Ceres–Negros (68 points) over Kaya–Iloilo (56 points)
Smallest title-winning margin: 5 points, 2017; Ceres–Negros (66 points) over Meralco Manila (61 points)

Points
 Most points in a season: 68, Ceres–Negros (2019)
 Most home points in a season: 40, Ceres–Negros (2017)
 Most away points in a season: 34, Ceres–Negros (2019)
 Most points without winning the league: 61, Meralco Manila (2017)
 Fewest points in a season: 2, Stallion Laguna (2020)
 Fewest home points in a season: 1, Stallion Laguna (2020)
 Fewest away points in a season: 1, Stallion Laguna (2020)
 Fewest points while winning the league: 12, United City (2020)

Wins
Most wins in total: 72, Ceres–Negros/United City
Most wins in a season: 22, Ceres–Negros (2019)
Most home wins in a season: 12, Ceres–Negros (2017)
Most away wins in a season: 11, Ceres–Negros (2019)
Fewest wins in a season: 0, Stallion Laguna (2020)
Fewest home wins in a season: 0
Ilocos United (2017)
Stallion Laguna (2020)
Fewest away wins in a season: 0, Stallion Laguna (2020)
Most consecutive wins: 16, Ceres–Negros (2019)
Most consecutive wins from the start of the season: 5
Ceres–Negros (2018)
Kaya–Iloilo (2019, 2022–23)
Meralco Manila (2017)
Most consecutive wins to the end of the season: 6, Ceres–Negros (2019)
Most consecutive games without a win: 21, Global Makati (2018 – 2019)
Most consecutive games without a win from the start of the season: 19, Ilocos United (2017)
Most consecutive games without a win to the end of the season: 20, Global Makati (2019)
Defeated all league opponents at least once in a season:
Ceres–Negros (2017, 2018, 2019)
Davao Aguilas (2018)
Kaya–Iloilo (2018, 2022–23)
Meralco Manila (2017)

Defeats
Most defeats in total: 48, Global
Most defeats in a season: 22, Global Cebu (2018)
Most home defeats in a season: 10, Global Cebu (2018)
Most away defeats in a season: 12 
Global Cebu (2018)
Ilocos United (2017)
Fewest defeats in a season: 0, Ceres–Negros (2019)
Fewest home defeats in a season: 0, Ceres–Negros (2019)
Fewest away defeats in a season: 0, Ceres–Negros (2018, 2019)
Most consecutive games undefeated: 30, Ceres–Negros/United City (2018 – 2020)
Most consecutive games undefeated from the start of the season: 24, Ceres–Negros (2019)
Most consecutive games undefeated to the end of the season: 24, Ceres–Negros (2019)
Most consecutive defeats: 16, Global Cebu/Global Makati (2018 – 2019)
Most consecutive defeats from the start of the season: 9, Maharlika Manila (2022–23)
Most consecutive defeats to the end of the season: 13, Global Cebu (2018)

Draws
Most draws in total: 19, Stallion Laguna
Most draws in a season: 10, Davao Aguilas (2017)
Most home draws in a season: 6, Davao Aguilas (2017)
Most away draws in a season: 5, Global Cebu (2017)
Fewest draws in a season: 0
ADT (2020)
Maharlika Manila (2020)
United City (2020)
Fewest home draws in a season: 0
ADT (2020)
Ceres–Negros (2018)
Kaya–Iloilo (2019)
Maharlika Manila (2020)
Philippine Air Force (2019)
United City (2020)
Fewest away draws in a season: 0
ADT (2020)
JPV Marikina (2018)
Maharlika Manila (2020)
United City (2020)
Most consecutive draws: 3, Davao Aguilas (2017)
Most consecutive games without a draw: 20, Stallion Laguna (2017 – 2018)

Goals
Most goals scored in a season: 99, Ceres–Negros (2019)
Fewest goals scored in a season: 2 
Maharlika Manila (2020)
Mendiola 1991 (2020)
Most goals conceded in a season: 92, Global Makati (2019)
Fewest goals conceded in a season: 2
ADT (2020)
Kaya–Iloilo (2020)
Best goal difference in a season: 87, Ceres–Negros (2019)
Worst goal difference in a season: –77, Global Makati (2019)
Highest finish with a negative goal difference: 4th, Mendiola 1991 (2020, –6)
Lowest finish with a positive goal difference: 4th 
Global Cebu (2017, +10)
Green Archers United (2019, +5)
Stallion Laguna (2018, +4)
Most goals scored at home in a season: 57, Ceres–Negros (2017)
Fewest goals scored at home in a season: 0 
Maharlika Manila (2020)
Mendiola 1991 (2020)
Most goals conceded at home in a season: 50, Global Makati (2019)
Fewest goals conceded at home in a season: 0
ADT (2020)
Kaya–Iloilo (2020)
Most goals scored away in a season: 51, Ceres–Negros (2017)
Fewest goals scored away in a season: 1, Stallion Laguna (2020)
Most goals conceded away in a season: 48, Philippine Air Force (2019)
Fewest goals conceded away in a season: 0, United City (2020)
Scored in every game:
Ceres–Negros (2019)
United City (2020)
Most consecutive matches scored in: 42, Ceres–Negros/United City (2018 – 2022–23)
Most goals scored in total: 273, Ceres–Negros/United City
Most goals conceded in total: 220, Global Cebu/Global Makati

Player records

Appearances
Most appearances: 82, Fitch Arboleda (6 May 2017 to 12 November 2022)
Most different clubs played for: 4
Daniel Gadia (for Meralco Manila, Global Cebu, Davao Aguilas, Stallion Laguna, Dynamic Herb Cebu)
Chima Uzoka (for Ilocos United, Stallion Laguna, Global Makati, ADT, Dynamic Herb Cebu)
Oldest Player: Yanti Barsales, 46 years and 3 months (for Philippine Air Force v. Ceres–Negros, 29 May 2019)
Youngest Player: Nico Nazal, 16 years and 7 months (for Ilocos United v. Davao Aguilas, 7 May 2017)

Players currently playing in the league are highlighted in bold.

Goals
First Philippines Football League goal: Curt Dizon (for Meralco Manila v. Stallion Laguna, 6 May 2017)
Most goals: 74, Bienvenido Marañón (Ceres–Negros/United City)
Most at one club: 74, Bienvenido Marañón (Ceres–Negros/United City)
Most seasons scored in: 5 (2017 – 2022–23)
Jovin Bedic
Kenshiro Daniels
Jesus Melliza
Robert Lopez Mendy
Stephan Schröck
Most goals in a season: 31, Jordan Mintah (Kaya–Iloilo, 2019)
Most debut goals in a season: 23, Bienvenido Marañón (Ceres–Negros, 2017)
Most different clubs to score for: 5, Chima Uzoka (for Ilocos United, Stallion Laguna, Global Makati, ADT, Dynamic Herb Cebu)
Most hat tricks: 8, Bienvenido Marañón (Ceres–Negros/United City)
Most hat tricks in a season: 5, Jordan Mintah (Kaya–Iloilo, 2019)
Most goals in a game: 4
John Celiz (for Green Archers United v. Global Makati, 14 July 2019) W 9–0
Arda Çınkır (for Dynamic Herb Cebu v. Mendiola 1991, 16 September 2022) W 7–1
Robert Lopez Mendy (for Ceres–Negros v. Mendiola 1991, 10 August 2019) W 5–2
Bienvenido Marañón (for Ceres–Negros v. Global Makati, 1 June 2019) W 8–0
Bienvenido Marañón (for Ceres–Negros v. Global Makati, 28 August 2019) W 13–0
Jesus Melliza (for Stallion Laguna v. Ilocos United, 10 September 2017) W 5–0
Jordan Mintah (for Kaya–Iloilo v. Philippine Air Force, 25 September 2019) W 5–0
Jordan Mintah (for Kaya–Iloilo v. Mendiola 1991, 9 October 2019) W 5–1
Mike Ott (for Ceres–Negros v. Philippine Air Force, 13 July 2019) W 12–0
Takumi Uesato (for JPV Marikina v. Global Cebu, 13 August 2017) W 5–2

Players currently playing in the league are highlighted in bold.

Assists
Most assists: 36, Stephan Schröck (Ceres–Negros/United City)
Most assists in one season: 21, Stephan Schröck (Ceres–Negros, 2019)
Most assists in a single match: 3
Paolo Bugas (for Green Archers United v. Global Makati, 14 July 2019)
Hikaru Minegishi (for United City v. Stallion Laguna, 2 November 2020)
Stephan Schröck (for Ceres–Negros v. Philippine Air Force, 13 July 2019)

Players currently playing in the league are highlighted in bold.

Goalkeepers
Most clean sheets: 22, Roland Müller (Ceres–Negros)
Most clean sheets in one season: 10, Roland Müller (for Ceres–Negros, 2019 Philippines Football League)
Most clean sheets at one club: 22, Roland Müller (Ceres–Negros)

Players currently playing in the league are highlighted in bold.

Disciplinary
Most red cards: 3
Jason Cordova  (Davao Aguilas, Stallion Laguna)
Jordan Mintah (Kaya–Iloilo)
OJ Porteria (Ceres–Negros)

Match records

Scorelines

Biggest home win: 
Ceres–Negros 12-0 Philippine Air Force (13 July 2019)
Biggest away win: 
Global Makati 0–13 Ceres–Negros (28 August 2019)
Biggest aggregate win: 
Ceres–Negros 27–0 Global Makati
Ceres–Negros 27–0 Philippine Air Force
Biggest loss by reigning champions:
Ceres–Negros 0–3 Davao Aguilas (12 August 2018)
Highest scoring: 0–13, Global Makati 0–13 Ceres–Negros (28 August 2019)
Highest scoring draw: 
Global Cebu 3–3 Ilocos United (15 November 2017)
JPV Marikina 3–3 Davao Aguilas (8 July 2018)
Dynamic Herb Cebu 3–3 United City (15 October 2022)

All-time Philippines Football League table
The all-time Philippines Football League table is a cumulative table of all match results, points and goals of every team that has played in the PFL since its first season in 2017. The table that follows is accurate as of the end of the 2020 season. Teams in bold are part of the 2021 Philippines Football League. Numbers in bold are the record (highest either positive or negative) numbers in each column.

Club status:

Notes

Managers
Most titles: 3, Risto Vidaković (Ceres–Negros) – 2017, 2018, 2019
Most clubs managed: 2, Dan Padernal (JPV Marikina, Mendiola 1991)
Longest spell as manager: 3 years, 314 days, Ernest Nierras (Stallion Laguna, 1 January 2017 – 9 November 2020)
Shortest spell as manager: 135 days, Toshiaki Imai (Global Cebu, 1 January 2017 – 15 May 2017)

Notes

 Regular season for 2017
 Won by series for 2017

References

records
Association football league records and statistics